Shanshan, shan-shan, or variation, may refer to:

Places
Shanshan, ancient kingdom in located in Xinjiang
Shanshan County, county in Xinjiang, Pichan County in Uyghur
 Shanshan, Loudi (杉山镇),  a town of Louxing District, Loudi City, Hunan

People
Shanshan Feng, Chinese golfer
Huang Shanshan, Chinese gymnast
Li Shanshan, Chinese gymnast

Other uses
Susanna (1967 film), Hong Kong film

See also

Typhoon Shanshan (disambiguation)
Shan (disambiguation)
Shanshang District, Tainan, Taiwan
Shanshang Subdialect, see Danzhou dialect
, Japanese band
Shangshan (disambiguation)